Terena may refer to:
 Terena people, an ethnic group in Brazil
 Terêna language, their language
 TERENA, Trans-European Research and Education Networking Association
 Terena (São Pedro), parish within the municipality Alandroal, Portugal